The Riding for the Disabled Association, also known as the RDA is a United Kingdom based charity founded in 1969 focused on providing therapeutic horse-riding, equestrian vaulting and carriage driving lessons to people with developmental and physical disabilities as well seeking to improve the lives of those with mental health difficulties. Princess Anne has been the organisations President since 1985.

The RDA is a federation of about 500 independent groups and serves over 26,500 adults and children each year and is one of 16 members that make up British Equestrian.

Since 2013, the RDA in partnership with British Equestrian, accredits commercial riding schools with the Accessibility Mark.

History

Beginnings of therapeutic riding 
The first known mentions of the benefits of horse riding for the disabled are found in 600BC Greek literature. The first study ascribed with value on the merits of equine-assisted therapy is then found in 1895 by French physician Cassaign who concluded that equine therapy helped certain neurological disorders.

Founding of the RDA 
In the 20th century, therapeutic horseback riding or equine-assisted therapy, became popular across Europe after Dane Lis Hartel, despite being paralyzed from the knees down by polio, won the silver medal for Individual Dressage at the 1952 Summer Olympics.

Her success inspired therapeutic horseback riding organisations to be created across Europe and by 1964, a loose organisation called the Advisory Council on Riding for the Disabled was formed to coordinate these groups.

By 1966, 23 of these were present in the United Kingdom and by 1969 were organised formally in to Riding for the Disabled Association with Lavinia Fitzalan-Howard, Duchess of Norfolk as its first president. In 1985 Princess Anne became RDA President, a position she still holds.

In 2019, the RDA celebrated its 50th anniversary.

Milestones

Notable successes 
At the London 2012 and Rio 2016 Paralympic Games all four of the Team GB Para riders started out with RDA.

See also
List of RDA groups
RDA Therapy
British Equestrian
Paralympics GB Equestrian
British Equestrian Para Driving
British Equestrian Para Showjumping

References

Equine therapies
Equestrian organizations
1965 establishments in the United Kingdom
Sports organizations established in 1965
Disability organisations based in the United Kingdom
Parasports organizations
Parasports in the United Kingdom
Health charities in the United Kingdom
Horses in the United Kingdom